Syed Ali Raza Abidi (6 July 1972 – 25 December 2018) was a Pakistani politician who was a member of the National Assembly of Pakistan from June 2013 to May 2018.

Early life
He was born on 6 July 1972 in Karachi, Pakistan to Syed Ikhlaq Hussain Abidi.

Political career

He was elected to the National Assembly of Pakistan as a candidate of Muttahida Qaumi Movement (MQM) from Constituency NA-251 (Karachi-XIII) in 2013 Pakistani general election. He received 81,603 votes and defeated Raja Azhar Khan, a candidate of Pakistan Tehreek-e-Insaf (PTI).

He ran for the seat of the National Assembly as a candidate of MQM Pakistan from Constituency NA-243 (Karachi East-II) in 2018 Pakistani general election but was unsuccessful. He received 24,082 votes and lost the seat to Imran Khan.

Death
He was shot dead in Karachi on 25 December 2018. The targeted gun attack took place outside his residence.

References

Muhajir people
Muttahida Qaumi Movement politicians
Pakistani MNAs 2013–2018
Politicians from Karachi
Muttahida Qaumi Movement MNAs
1972 births
2018 deaths
Deaths by firearm in Pakistan
Assassinated Pakistani politicians